"Beetlebum" is a song by English alternative rock band Blur. It was released on 20 January 1997 as the lead single from the band's eponymous fifth album, Blur (1997). Written about Blur frontman Damon Albarn's experiences with heroin, the song features Beatles-influenced music and a mood that Albarn described as "sleepy" and "sexy."

Despite fears of the song's uncommercial nature, the single debuted at number one on the UK Singles Chart, becoming Blur's second track to reach the top of the charts. It has since appeared on several Blur compilations.

Background
"Beetlebum" was inspired by heroin and the drug experiences Damon Albarn had with his then-girlfriend, Justine Frischmann of Elastica. Albarn reflected, "That whole period of a lot of people's lives was fairly muddied by heroin for a lot of people. And it's sort of, it's in that place. And a lot of stuff was at that time." He has stated in an interview with MTV that the song describes a complicated emotion, sort of "sleepy" and sort of "sexy".

Rolling Stone hypothesises that the song's title is a reference to the phrase "chasing the beetle," further linking the song to Albarn's experimentation with drugs. Albarn commented, "I'm not sure what a Beetlebum is. It's just a word I sang when I played the song to myself. I asked the others if I should change it, but they said no. If it felt right, we decided that we wouldn't tidy it up like we've done in the past. It's about drugs basically." Producer Stephen Street later commented, "I didn't know Beetlebum was about heroin. I thought it was just something he’d made up!"

Bassist Alex James explained of the song, "I think 'Beetlebum' is representative of the fact that as the band's got older, the songs have become more simple. Now we can play them with a lot more feeling." Street similarly pointed to the song as a pivotal one for the band, commenting, "Listening back to Damon Albarn’s vocals on 'Beetlebum' for the first time, I had tears in my eyes, thinking: 'This is special'."

The song has been described as a "Beatles tribute" by several publications; Stephen Thomas Erlewine of Allmusic wrote that the song "[ran] through the White Album in the space of five minutes."

Release
Because of its stylistic differences from Blur's previous singles, "Beetlebum" was expected to be a commercial disappointment. As James recalls, "When we first took it around, 'Beetlebum' was perceived as commercial suicide." Despite these fears, "Beetlebum" was a chart hit in the UK, becoming the band's second number-one single (after "Country House"). The single also reached the top ten in several European countries as well as number 13 in Canada.

In addition to its release on Blur, the song has appeared on compilations such as Blur: The Best Of and Midlife: A Beginner's Guide to Blur. It was remixed by Moby for the remix album Bustin' + Dronin'.

Music video
The "Beetlebum" music video was directed by Sophie Muller. The downbeat video combines a performance of the song in a room in a tall building with computer-generated zoom-outs from the set showing the Earth in the centre of kaleidoscopic patterns. Alex James' cigarette and Dave Rowntree's Coke can are censored, although in recent version both of them are uncensored. The video concludes with the camera zooming out of the room to show a shot of the River Thames and London's skyline.

Track listings
All music was composed by Damon Albarn, Graham Coxon, Alex James and Dave Rowntree. All lyrics were written by Albarn.

UK CD1
 "Beetlebum"
 "All Your Life"
 "A Spell (For Money)"

UK CD2
 "Beetlebum"
 "Beetlebum" (Mario Caldato Jr. mix)
 "Woodpigeon Song"
 "Dancehall"

UK limited-edition 7-inch red vinyl single
 "Beetlebum"
 "Woodpigeon Song"

Japanese CD single
 "Beetlebum"
 "All Your Life"
 "Woodpigeon Song"
 "A Spell (For Money)"

Personnel
 Damon Albarn – lead vocals, synthesizers, acoustic guitar
 Graham Coxon – electric guitar, backing vocals
 Alex James – bass guitar
 Dave Rowntree – drums

Charts and certifications

Weekly charts

Year-end charts

Certifications

References

Blur (band) songs
1997 singles
1997 songs
Food Records singles
Music videos directed by Sophie Muller
Number-one singles in Scotland
Parlophone singles
Song recordings produced by Stephen Street
Songs about drugs
Songs about heroin
Songs written by Alex James (musician)
Songs written by Damon Albarn
Songs written by Dave Rowntree
Songs written by Graham Coxon
UK Singles Chart number-one singles